RNAS Caldale is a former Royal Naval Air Service airship station located  west of Kirkwall, Orkney and  south east of Finstown, Orkney, Scotland. It was constructed in 1915 and was operational from 1916 to 1920.

History
Caldale had two large airship hangars which housed Submarine Scout Pusher airships that operated anti-submarine and mine spotting sweeps near to Orkney.

However, this was fraught was danger as during November 1917 SSP-2 and SSP-4 were both destroyed in high winds with the crew of SSP-4 lost at sea. Not long after these losses and other damage caused to airships due to the wind the Admiralty decided to close the airship station and move the airship further south on mainland Britain.

During January 1918, the airship station became a kite balloon repair station and was home to No. 20 Kite Balloon Base.

Current use
The site is currently open land.

See also
 List of former Royal Air Force stations

References

Citations

Bibliography
 

Royal Air Force stations in Scotland
Buildings and structures in Orkney
Defunct airports in Scotland
Royal Naval Air Service
Royal Naval Air Stations in Scotland
Airports established in 1915
Airports disestablished in 1920
1915 establishments in Scotland
1920 disestablishments in Scotland
Mainland, Orkney